The Hemmens Cultural Center is a 1,200-seat theatre in Elgin, Illinois, United States.  It's also the home of the Elgin Symphony Orchestra.

References

Theatres in Illinois
Buildings and structures in Elgin, Illinois